The following are events from the year 1825 in the United States.

Incumbents

Federal Government 
 President: James Monroe (DR-Virginia) (until March 4), John Quincy Adams (DR/NR-Massachusetts) (starting March 4)
 Vice President: Daniel D. Tompkins (DR-New York) (until March 4), John C. Calhoun (D-South Carolina) (starting March 4)
 Chief Justice: John Marshall (Virginia)
 Speaker of the House of Representatives: Henry Clay (DR-Kentucky) (until March 4), John W. Taylor (DR-New York) (starting December 5)
 Congress: 18th (until March 4), 19th (starting March 4)

Events

January–March
 January 10 – Indianapolis becomes the capital of Indiana (moved from Corydon, Indiana).
 February 9 – After no presidential candidate receives a majority of U.S. Electoral College votes, the United States House of Representatives elects John Quincy Adams President of the United States in a contingent election.
 February 12 – Treaty of Indian Springs: The Lower Creek Council, led by William McIntosh, cedes a large amount of Creek territory in Georgia to the United States government.
 March 4 – John Quincy Adams is sworn in as the sixth President of the United States, and John C. Calhoun is sworn in as Vice President of the United States.
 March 17 – The Norfolk & Dedham Group is founded as The Norfolk Mutual Fire Insurance Company.

April–June
 April 30 – Upper Creek chief Menawa leads an attack that assassinates William McIntosh for signing the Treaty of Indian Springs.
 May 11 – American Tract Society is founded.
 June 3 – Kansa Nation cedes its territory to the United States (see History of Kansas).
 June 11 – The first cornerstone is laid for Fort Hamilton in New York City.

July–September
 July 14 – The Jefferson Literary and Debating Society is founded by 16 disgruntled members of the now-defunct Patrick Henry Society in Room 7, West Lawn, of the University of Virginia.
 August 19 – First Treaty of Prairie du Chien at Fort Crawford, Prairie du Chien, Wisconsin

October–December
 October 25 – The Erie Canal opens, granting passage from Albany, New York to Lake Erie.
 November 7 – Treaty of St. Louis: 1,400 Missouri Shawnees are forcibly relocated from Missouri to Kansas. (See History of Kansas)
 November 12 – New Echota designated capital of the Cherokee Nation.
 November 26 – At Union College in Schenectady, New York a group of college students form Kappa Alpha Society as the first college social fraternity (it is the first to combine aspects of secret Greek-letter societies, literary societies and formalized student social groups).

Undated
 The Osage Nation cedes traditional lands by treaty.
 The Cherokee Nation officially adopts Sequoyah's syllabary.
 Vancouver, Washington is established by Dr. John McLoughlin on behalf of the Hudson's Bay Company.
 Ypsilanti, Michigan is established.
 Vicksburg, Mississippi is incorporated.
 New Harmony, Indiana established as a social experiment, built by the Harmony Society and sold to Robert Owen.
 The United States Postal Service starts a dead letter office.
 Centenary College of Louisiana is founded in Jackson, Louisiana. The campus later moves to Shreveport, Louisiana.

Ongoing
 Era of Good Feelings (1817–1825)
 John Neal publishing serially the first written history of American literature (1824-1825)

Births
 January 5 – John Mason Loomis, lumber tycoon, Union militia colonel in the American Civil War and philanthropist (died 1900)
 January 11
 Clement V. Rogers, Cherokee politician and father of Will Rogers (died 1911)
 Bayard Taylor, poet and travel writer (died 1878)
 January 25 – George Pickett, Confederate general in the American Civil War (died 1876)
 February 11 – Frank Pidgeon, baseball pitcher (died 1884)
 April 7 – John H. Gear, U.S. Senator from Iowa from 1895 to 1900 (died 1900)
 April 17 – Jerome B. Chaffee, U.S. Senator from Colorado from 1876 to 1879 (died 1886)
 June 1 – John Hunt Morgan, Confederate general in the American Civil War (died 1864)
 July 2 – Richard Henry Stoddard, critic and poet (died 1903)
 July 10 – Benjamin Paul Akers, sculptor (died 1861)
 July 15 – Joseph Carter Abbott, U.S. Senator from North Carolina from 1868 to 1871 (died 1881)
 July 19 – George H. Pendleton, politician (died 1889)
 August 7 – Jacob Wrey Mould, New York architect, illustrator, linguist and musician (died 1886)
 August 10 – Edmund Spangler, carpenter and stagehand employed at Ford's Theatre at the time of the assassination of Abraham Lincoln (died 1875)
 September 13 – William Henry Rinehart, sculptor (died 1874)
 September 17 – Lucius Quintus Cincinnatus Lamar II, politician and Associate Justice of the Supreme Court of the United States (died 1893)
 September 24 – Frances Harper, née Watkins, African American poet and abolitionist (died 1911)
 October 8 – Paschal Beverly Randolph, occultist (died 1875)
 November 9 – A. P. Hill, Confederate general (killed 1865 in the American Civil War)
 December 18 – John S. Harris, U.S. Senator from Louisiana from 1868 to 1871 (died 1906)
 December 30
 Newton Booth, U.S. Senator from California from 1875 to 1881 (died 1892)
 Samuel Newitt Wood, politician (died 1891)

Deaths
 January 8 – Eli Whitney, inventor of the cotton gin and milling machine (born 1765)
 March 1 – John Haggin, "Indian fighter" and early settler of Kentucky (born 0420)
 March 4 – Hercules Mulligan, tailor and spy during the American Revolutionary War (born 1740)
 March 25 – Raphaelle Peale, still-life painter (born 1774)
 June 1 – Daniel Tompkins, sixth Vice President of the United States from 1817 to 1825 (born 1774)
 June 4 – Morris Birkbeck, writer and social reformer (born 1764)
 June 14 – Pierre Charles L'Enfant, architect and civil engineer (born 1754 in France)
 August 16 – Charles Cotesworth Pinckney, politician and soldier (born 1746) 
 August 27 – Lucretia Maria Davidson, poet (born 1808; died of consumption)
 December 28 – James Wilkinson, soldier and statesman (born 1757)

See also
Timeline of United States history (1820–1859)

References

External links
 

 
1820s in the United States
United States
United States
Years of the 19th century in the United States